Visa requirements for Senegalese citizens are administrative entry restrictions imposed on citizens of Senegal by the authorities of other states.
As of 2 July 2019, Senegalese citizens had visa-free or visa on arrival access to 55 countries and territories, ranking the Senegalese passport 89th in terms of travel freedom (tied with passports from Gabon, Guinea, Rwanda and Togo) according to the Henley Passport Index.

Visa requirements map

Visa requirements

Dependent, disputed, or restricted territories
Unrecognized or partially recognized countries

Dependent and autonomous territories

See also 

 Visa policy of Senegal
 Senegalese passport

References and notes
References

Notes

Senegal
Foreign relations of Senegal